This is a list of Pound Puppies characters from the television series that ran from 1986 to 1989, the TV film, and Pound Puppies and the Legend of Big Paw. The animated children's show was based on the popular 1980's stuffed toy line.

Characters

Pound Puppies

Cooler (Beagle/Bloodhound mix) – Cooler is the leader of the Pound Puppies. As his name would imply, Cooler has an outgoing and mellow personality and always keeps his head up even in the most daring situations. He also has a witty and sharp sense of humor compared to the other characters in the series, which is also backed up by his goofy Eddie Murphy-styled laugh. His battle cry is "Pound Puppies, let's start pounding!" In the season 2 episode Cooler, Come Back, Cooler is finally caught by Katrina Stoneheart. However, he escapes from Katrina's clutches in an unknown part of the United States and is taken to a dog pound with No-Name, a dog who refuses to be adopted. After saving every dog from the red leash, Cooler is about to be done for. Fortunately, No-Name (Now King) and his new master, Carolyn, save him and Cooler is reunited with Holly and the Pound Puppies. Cooler and Holly have a special bond since the season 1 episode How to Found a Pound, when he helped Holly save the pound for the first time from Katrina Stoneheart. In Pound Puppies and the Legend of Big Paw, he wears a white leather jacket (He has a blue leather jacket in the TV series) and his personality is a little more serious than in the TV series. In the TV special, he has a crush on Violet Vanderfeller and has a record of 762 escapes (which Cooler refers as "A nasty habit I'm trying to quit"). Voiced by Dan Gilvezan in both the TV series and the TV special. In Pound Puppies and the Legend of Big Paw, Cooler is voiced by Brennan Howard and his singing voice is provided by Ashley Hall.

Nose Marie (Boxer/Bloodhound mix) – Nose Marie is the oldest female of the team. In the first series, she is flirtatious, has good manners, is a bit boastful at times, and is shown to have romantic interests in Cooler. In the second series, she is kind, mature, and has a motherly role over the younger Pound Puppies. When running scares, she often screams out "Eek! Eek! Eek I say! Eek!". In the season 2 episode Nose Marie Day, the other Pound Puppies decide to dedicate a holiday to her. However, Nose Marie feels like the "relaxing is becoming downright exhausting." When she feels like she is not wanted anymore, she runs away and is about to leave with Lisa, a little girl whose family is moving away. Just then, the Pound Puppies stop Nose Marie because they want her to know that she is important to them and they will not be the same without her. In the TV special, Nose Marie is referred as "The Nose" and has a record of 15 escapes. In Pound Puppies and the Legend of Big Paw, she wears a pink dress and is somewhat like Cooler's girlfriend (As she is in Season 1 of the TV series). It is also revealed in the movie and in the TV special that she can track a scent with her nose (According to Nose Marie, her nose knows best.) Voiced by Ruth Buzzi in the TV series and in Pound Puppies and the Legend of Big Paw. Nose Marie is originally voiced by Joanne Worley with a Brooklyn accent in the TV Special.

Howler (Pug/Dalmatian mix) – Howler is the inventor of the Pound Puppies squad. His inventions often solve the teams' problems. His trademark red derby comes with a mechanical hand that helps him invent or read a book when he has his hands full. As his name implies, he often howls after the end of his sentences or at the end of an episode. In season 1, Howler often stutters in his sentences, which is backed up by his howling. In season 2, Howler is generally not the spotlight puppy and has appeared in fewer episodes than he did in Season 1. In the season 1 episode In Pups We Trust, Howler is accused of stealing the Pound Puppies beloved items. He runs away from Holly's Puppy Pound and befriends a homeless dog named Spudge. While looking for food, they are almost kidnapped by Captain Slaughter. Fortunately, Howler's friends are able to save him and Spudge. Afterward, Howler is happy to be back with his friends. In Pound Puppies and the Legend of Big Paw, Howler wears a green derby (red in the TV series), a red shirt with short sleeves (yellow in the TV series), and has brown curly hair (yellow in the TV series) and is not the bravest puppy of the group. Voiced by Robert Morse. He is originally voiced by Frank Welker in the Pound Puppies TV special and only howls. In Pound Puppies and the Legend of Big Paw, Howler is voiced by Hal Rayle and his howling vocal effects are provided by Frank Welker.

Bright Eyes (Yellow Labrador Retriever) – Bright Eyes is the youngest female of the team, her name based on her bright blue eyes back in Season 1 and in the TV special. She is sweet, passionate, and extremely energetic. A hobby of hers is cheerleading, which is seen as one of her roles in the show. At times, she comes across as rather naive and ditzy, but is always aware of what is going on in a situation. In Season 2, Bright Eyes is younger than in season 1. In the season 1 episode Bright Eyes, Come Home, Bright Eyes wants to be adopted. After an incident during the episode, Bright Eyes decides to stay with the Pound Puppies. Her dream of being adopted is not mentioned again in the series. In Pound Puppies and the Legend of Big Paw, she wears a green shirt (blue in season 2, originally green in season 1), a yellow skirt (blue in the TV series), and has white fur (yellow in the TV series). Voiced by Nancy Cartwright impersonating Mae Questel in the TV series and in Pound Puppies and the Legend of Big Paw. Bright Eyes is originally voiced by Adrienne Alexander in the Pound Puppies TV Special.

Whopper (Jack Russell Terrier) – Whopper is the youngest of the Pound Puppies. He is often fantasizing and imagining nearly impossible situations, and telling little white lies. He wears a diaper even though he is officially a "kid". Whopper also has a brother-sister relationship with Bright Eyes, as they often share opinions, come to agreements, and experience things together. He also dresses up in many different outfits as alter-egos during a heroic or otherwise serious situation, and provides comic relief. His most notable outfit and alter-ego is Wonder Whopper, in which Whopper wears a red cape and a blue bodysuit inspired by Superman. In the season 2 episode The Wonderful World of Whopper, he helps a puppy named Beezer snap out of her boredom with the power of his imagination. In season 2 he states that he wants to be a Golden Retriever when he grows up. Bright Eyes counters this by saying he is a "Mixed Breed." In the present day storyline of Pound Puppies and the Legend of Big Paw, he is an adult and shares the Bone of Scone story when he is a kid with his niece and nephew. Also, Whopper no longer wears a diaper and instead wears a blue shirt, blue pants, a blue cap, and is somewhat older than he is in the TV Series. Voiced by B.J. Ward in both the TV series and Pound Puppies and The Legend of Big Paw.

Beamer (Scottish terrier/Schnauzer mix) – Beamer is a happy-go-lucky puppy and behaves in a cheerful gentleman-like manner. Beamer likes to eat scones, crumpets, cookies and sandwiches. He is able to talk in other languages and accents besides his decidedly Scottish accent, like French, Spanish, and Welsh. His catchphrases are "Good tidings" and "Sometimes I did things that I'm not supposed to do, but I learn from them" and "It's awesome!" He will also say "Wow, that is really out of character" whenever he sees one of his friends behaving in a strange way and "Sweet Henrietta!" Beamer can also be fussy, clean and will not tolerate anything dirty. Sometimes, he has terrible classes. He is also part bull terrier. Beamer appears in Pound Puppies and the Legend of Big Paw. He is voiced by Greg Berg.

Barkerville (English Bulldog) – Barkerville or "Barky" by his friends is an upper-class, snobbish dog. Sometimes, he can be stubborn, smug and naughty, but is kind at heart. He behaves like a gentleman toward women, especially Violet. Barkerville appears in the Pound Puppies TV special. He makes a brief cameo appearance with Violet and Scrounger in Wagga Wagga at the beginning of Cooler's flashback. He is voiced by Alan Oppenheimer in the TV special and by Robert Morse in Wagga Wagga.

Reflex (Schnoodle/Old English sheepdog mix) – Reflex is a lovesick dog. His tactic is kissing all of his friends, which is followed by his catchphrase "I love you!" every time he hears a bell ring. His tactic can be used whenever needed, but most of the time, instead of doing it for mischief he uses it to make his friends happy whenever they feel sad. It also turns the other Pound Puppies back to normal when they are brainwashed by Marvin McNasty's Mean Machine. He is a mix with a purebred Bernese Mountain dog. Reflex appears in Pound Puppies and the Legend of Big Paw. He is voiced by Hal Rayle.

Violet Vanderfeller (Greyhound/Shar Pei Mix) – A dog from a rich family who is kidnapped by Flack and Tubbs as a ransom. However, Violet is able to escape from her kidnappers and lands in the City Pound. She has a crush on Cooler. At the end of the Pound Puppies TV special, she is happily reunited with her owners. Until the end of the TV special, Cooler referred Violet as "Sam". Along with Barkerville and Scrounger, Violet makes a brief cameo appearance in the Season 1 episode Wagga Wagga at the beginning of Cooler's flashback. Her hobby is relaxing in a bath. She also has a hobby of teaching younger puppies about manners. Voiced by Gail Matthius.

Louie (Cane Corso/Chinook Mix) – A dog who served food to Violet and Cooler. Louie is an excellent cook. He speaks with a French accent. According to Cooler, Louie is not a good joke teller. He has an assistant who plays a violin. Louie appears in the Pound Puppies TV special. Voiced by Don Messick.

Scrounger (Beagle/Shar Pei Mix) – In the Pound Puppies TV Special, he is a member of the Pound Puppies with yellow fur and loved garbage. He has a record of 29 escapes. His habit is finding junk, trinkets, or useless knick-knacks. In the Season 1 episode Wagga Wagga, he makes a brief cameo appearance with Violet and Barkerville in the beginning of Cooler's flashback. Scrounger's guest starring role is in Garbage Night: The Musical. This time, Scrounger's fur is gray and his eating habits gives him frequent stomach aches. Despite his earlier refusal to eat healthy foods, the Pound Puppies are able to show him the truth behind eating junk food and Scrounger no longer eats garbage. He is later adopted by Melissa. He is voiced by Ron Palillo in the TV special, Frank Welker and Gregg Berger in the TV series.

Other dogs

Uncle J.R. – Whopper's uncle, who is seen once in the episode Whopper Cries Uncle. Whopper and the Pound Puppies once try to trick him into thinking Whopper is rich to impress him, but in the end, it turns out J.R. is not rich either. He later gets adopted by a Texas family. Even though he may look and sound like a cow dog, he is actually from Milwaukee. Uncle J.R. is afraid of cats. Voiced by John Stephenson.

Biff Barker (Basset Hound) – Whopper's hero. He works in a TV show that is about ghost-catching. In real life, however, he is a coward. Biff is able to conquer his fear to save the Pound Puppies from being turned into fur coats. He appears in Ghost Hounders. Voiced by Brian Cummings.

Zazu, the Fairy Dogmother – A scatterbrained fairy dog who appears in The Fairy Dogmother. Every time she tries to grant a wish to help the Pound Puppies, her wishes backfire. However, Zazu is able to master her magic and helps the Pound Puppies and Holly at the Prom. She makes a brief return in Happy Howlidays. Zazu is voiced by Joan Gardner.

Teensy – A tiny puppy whom Nose Marie rescues from Catgut. He appears in Little Big Dog. He is voiced by Lorenzo Music.

Toots – A girl dog who cons Bright Eyes into stealing wienies and squeaky toys for her gang. She is the leader of a tough dog gang called the Crushers. She has long, brown hair with a pink flower and wears a green jacket. When Bright Eyes is being chased by Katrina, Toots and her gang come to the rescue, along with the Pound Puppies. At the end, she is adopted by Mrs. Vanderspiff and goes straight. She appears in The Bright Eyes Mob. She is voiced by Dana Hill.

Sparky (Golden Retriever) – A puppy who is more like a fire dog than a retriever, much to Whopper's chagrin. He is then adopted by the Fire Department after saving Whopper and Holly from a fire. He appears in Where's the Fire?. Voiced by Gabriel Damon.

Lucy (Samoyed) – A pregnant dog. Her life partner is Rusty, a father-to-be. While pregnant, she has a terrible craving for a dog food and ice cream sundae (with chocolate syrup, Limburger cheese, ketchup, gumdrops, etc.) According to Nose Marie and Holly, she is starving. At the end of Where Puppies Come From, she gives birth to three puppies, Candy, Mandy, and Andy. She, Rusty and their three children are later adopted in Pups on the Loose. Voiced by Patricia Parris.

Rusty (Plott Hound) – A father-to-be whose life partner is Lucy. At one point, Rusty is very nervous about having puppies. At the end of Where Puppies Come From, Lucy gives birth to Mandy, Candy, and Andy. Along with Lucy, he and their children are later adopted in Pups on the Loose. Voiced by Phil Proctor.

Candy, Mandy, and Andy (Samoyed/Plott Hound mix) – Puppy triplets who constantly bicker over everything (Who want to use green paint, who want to use flour, who want to lick the spoon, and which owner should they live with). However, their bickering get the better of them after they are nearly captured by Katrina and break puppy power. When they hear that they have to be with an individual owner, they promise to work together and never argue ever again. They are born by Lucy and Rusty in Where Puppies Come From and adopted with their parents in Pups on the Loose. They are voiced by Russi Taylor, Thy Lee, and Benji Gregory respectively.

No-Name (Later named King) – A dog who is stubborn and will not want to be adopted. After seeing Cooler's unselfish deeds (telling kids to adopt dogs in Cage 1 and saving No-Name from getting stuck), No-Name becomes a good guy and is able to save Cooler from a terrible fate. He is then adopted by a girl named Carolyn and is named King. King appears in the final episode Cooler, Come Back. King is voiced by Rob Paulsen (Though his name is uncredited at the end credits).

Princefeld – One of Toots' partners in crime. He wears a red Gatsby cap with a yellow patch, a pair of sunglasses, and a green jacket. Along with Toots, he and his comrades are adopted by Mrs. Vanderspiff and go straight. He appears in The Bright Eyes Mob. He is voiced by Jim Cummings.

Shauna – A pregnant shar-pei who appears in Snowbound Pound. She is separated from her owners, the Simons, during a severe snowstorm. Fortunately, the Pound Puppies and Holly rescue her. Later, with the help of Dr. Weston, Holly, and the Pound Puppies, Shauna gives birth to nine puppies and is reunited with her owners. Voiced by Linda Gary.

Penelope – Cooler's former girlfriend. Penelope is separated from Cooler during the Wagga-Wagga incident. She now has a husband named Danny and children. While Penelope and her family go on a rescue mission, Danny and the children are captured by Captain Slaughter. With the help of the Pound Puppies, she rescues Danny and her children and are adopted at the end of Wagga Wagga. Voiced by Linda Gary.

Pupnick (Shiba) – A dog from Mongrowlia, a fictional country similar to Russia. He has a love interest for Bright Eyes during his time with Cooler and the gang while being pursued by Clawfinger's henchmen. The reason why Pupnick is pursued is because he wears a collar that contains a brain crystal. He helps the Pound Puppies save Bright Eyes and defeat Clawfinger in Secret Agent Pup. He is later adopted. Voiced by Pat Fraley.

Casey – A puppy who is separated from his master, Jonathon, during their camping trip. With help from the Pound Puppies, he is able to reunite with Jonathon and his family. He appears in Casey, Come Home. Voiced by Danny Cooksey.

Beezer – A puppy who, at the beginning of The Wonderful World of Whopper, is "so bored I could scream" and she does. However, Whopper is able to get Beezer out of boredom and Beezer uses her imagination to have fun. She is later adopted and with her owner, Davie, they have a wonderful imagination via The Wizard of Oz. Voiced by Allyce Beasley.

Itchy and Snichey (Doberman Pinchers) – Nabbit's two guard dogs who appear in the Pound Puppies TV special. Like Nabbit, they also have fleas. Note that Itchy has red eyes and Snichey has yellow eyes. They are voiced by Don Messick and Frank Welker respectively.

Big Paw (Newfoundland/Pug, Old English Sheepdog mix) – A giant dog who is the Guardian of the Bone of Scone. Big Paw is a friendly dog who is alone and has no friends. When the Pound Puppies tell him that he is not really ugly, Big Paw becomes a good friend and an ally. At the end of Pound Puppies and the Legend of Big Paw, he is adopted by the museum in order to keep the Bone of Scone from falling into the wrong hands. Big Paw is voiced by Tony Longo while his growling vocal effects are provided by Frank Welker and his singing voice was provided by Mark Vieha.

Collette (Saint-Usuge Spaniel) – A young mother of puppies. She and Whopper are kidnapped by Bones and Lumpy and are turned into guard dogs by Marvin McNasty's Mean Machine. Toward the end of the movie, Collette returns to normal after one of her puppies said "I love you" to her. She appears in Pound Puppies and the Legend of Big Paw. Voiced by Cathy Cavadini.

Florence (Golden Retriever) – A nurse dog who announces the birth of Collette's young puppies. She also attends to the birth of Collette's children. Her name is a play of Florence Nightingale, who is a well-known English nurse. Florence appears in Pound Puppies and the Legend of Big Paw. Voiced by Susan Silo.

Schap (Saint Bernard) – A dog who serves as a hospital helper to the Pound Puppies when Cheep-Cheep, a bird rescued by Bright Eyes, gets injured. He is later adopted at the end of The Bird Dog. Vocal effects provided by Frank Welker.

Fred (Shar Pei) – A young puppy who gets loose and is chased by Katrina. Fortunately, Fred is rescued by Nose Marie. He is adopted by a girl named Lisa. He appears in Nose Marie Day. Voiced by Phillip Glasser.

Thunderhawk (Siberian Husky) – A puppy who prefers the cold better than the heat. He participates in the Dog Sled Race at Alaska. When the Pound Puppies are in danger, he gives up the race in order to save them. Though he loses the race, Nahook, his owner, still adopts him because of his bravery. Thunderhawk appears in Snow Puppies. Voiced by Vaughn Tyree Jelks.

Spats (Miniature Australian Shepherd) – A girl dog whom Cooler and King meet at the dog pound. When she is in cage one, Cooler is able to save Spats by telling a young boy to adopt her. She is last seen with her new owner in Cooler, Come Back. Voiced by Ami Foster.

Canine Cafe Trio – They are the owners of the self-proclaimed "Canine Cafe", where stray dogs eat nothing but junk food. A male French poodle is the waiter while his two assistants are a female Nova-Scotia Duck-Trolling Retriever with a pink bow and a female Chihuahua/Terrier mix dog with a green bow. Like Scrounger, they used to eat junk food all the time. At the end of Garbage Night: The Musical, they learn their lesson and are now living with their owners at the Haven House Children's House. The poodle waiter is voiced by René Auberjonois and his two assistants are voiced by Thy Lee and Janice Tori.

Toby – A puppy who is adopted by Henry in Good Night, Sweet Pups.

Bessie – A girl puppy who is about to be adopted by Shannon when Katrina stops her and her parents from adopting Bessie. Cooler and Nose Marie are able to deliver Bessie to Shannon at her house. Bessie appears in King Whopper. Voiced by Thy Lee.

Shaky (Chihuahua) – A puppy who is abandoned by its previous owners and is traumatized. When Shaky is afraid of humans, Cooler tells his story of how the pound came to be and how met Millicent and Holly. Shaky, convinced by Cooler's story, no longer fears humans. He appears in How to Found a Pound. Voiced by Patric Zimmerman.

Buster – A puppy who often turns into a tornado and breaks everything. In reality, he has no loving family to teach him manners. When the Belleveshires' library is wrecked by Catgut, the Pound Puppies think Buster does it. After the Pound Puppies and Holly are kicked out of the Beleveshires' mansion, Nose Marie blames Buster, even though Buster is not the one who wrecked the library. While the other Pound Puppies and Holly foils Katrina's plan to close down the pound, Nose Marie apologizes to Buster and Buster forgives her. Buster is later adopted by the Belveshires after making Hubert, the Belveshires' only son, happy. He appears in From Wags to Riches. Voiced by Pat Fraley.

The Three Wise Guys: Byron, Fleeco, and Wolfie – A trio of canine comedians who are looking for the Star Puppy in The Star Pup. Byron P. Fleabottom is a small Aidi and his partners are Fleeco, a tall, lanky Beagle-Harrier, and Wolfie, a round Bearded Collie who only honks his nose and has a crush on Bright Eyes. The Three Wise Guys are a play on the Marx Brothers (with Byron inspired by Groucho Marx, Wolfie inspired by Harpo Marx, and Fleeco inspired by Chico Marx.) and their theme song are played to the tune of Three Blind Mice (inspired by The Three Stooges). Fleeco, Wolfie and Byron are voiced by Pat Fraley, Frank Welker and Roger Rose, respectively.

Arf – A puppy who usually "arfs" in between his sentences in The Rescue Pups. Arf is heartbroken when Jody's mother refuses to let Jody adopted him. When Jody is in trouble, Arf and the Pound Puppies, along with the Fire Department and the Police Department, rescue Jody. In the end, Jody's mother changes her mind and Arf is adopted. Voiced by Kath Soucie.

Tiny – A little puppy who has a limp in Happy Howlidays. He is chased out of an alley by two alley dogs who hate stray dogs. Tiny is rescued by the Pound Puppies. Later, the Pound Puppies taught the alley dogs that friendship should be important. Heartbroken, the alley dogs apologize to Tiny and wish him Merry Christmas. Tiny, The Pound Puppies, and the Two Alley Dogs howl to the tune of God rest you merry, gentlemen when Holly's Puppy Pound is closed. When the pound is reopened, Tiny is adopted by a boy named Charlie. The fate of his former bullies is unknown. Tiny is inspired by Tiny Tim, a character from Charles Dickens' A Christmas Carol who also is crippled. He is voiced by Danny Cooksey and the two alley dogs are voiced by Frank Welker and Brian Cummings.

Buddy – A puppy who has an "imaginary friend" named Bob. To the Pound Puppies, Buddy makes up Bob whenever he causes trouble. However, it turns out that Bob is actually an invisible Brontosaurus thanks to puppy power. Buddy is later adopted by Colin, whose imaginary friend is Bob's cousin, Sam. Buddy is voiced by Nancy Cartwright and Bob the Brontosaurus is voiced by Frank Welker.

Yapper – Biff Barker's agent. He usually accompanies Biff Barker and is concerned for Biff's safety. When he and Biff Barker finds out that the Terrible Terrier is not real and learns about Katrina's plan, they rescue the Pound Puppies from being turned into fur coats. He appears in Ghost Hounders. Voiced by Pat Fraley.

Pal – A young puppy in Tail of the Pup whose tail is unable to wag. Although the Pound Puppies try everything to cheer up Pal, they decide to let puppy power show him who is going to adopt him, a boy named Greg. When he hears that Greg's friend recently moved away, Pal decides to cheer him up and his tail finally wags. He is now adopted by Greg. Voiced by Brice Beckham.

Bowser – A puppy who is kidnapped by Captain Slaughter in The Captain and the Cats the night before he is about to be adopted. He is later rescued by the Pound Puppies. Voiced by Casey Ellison. Not to be confused with Bowser, the main villain from the Super Mario video games.

Danny – Penelope's husband. He and Penelope are married and have three children. In an attempt to rescue the captured citizens of Wagga Wagga, Danny and his children are captured by Captain Slaughter. With the help of the Pound Puppies, Danny and the children are rescued and reunited with Penelope. They are last seen with their new owners. Danny appears in Wagga Wagga. Voiced by Frank Welker.

Clawfinger (Bulldog) – A criminal mastermind who wants to kidnap Pupnick and other dogs to hypnotize them under his control with a brain crystal encased in Pupnik's collar. He owns the Casino Evil. His two henchmen kidnap Bright Eyes and hold her hostage. When the other Pound Puppies and Pupnick reach his hideout at Mount Muttmore, Clawfinger is about to use his machine to brainwash all the dogs in the world when Cooler, faking his hypnotized state, destroys the machine and traps Clawfinger and his men. He resembles and behaves like Al Capone. Clawfinger is the only dog to be a villain. Appears in Secret Agent Pup. Voiced by Roger Rose. His sidekicks are voiced by Roger Rose and Frank Welker.

Blue – A puppy whom Jerry adopted. When the Pound Puppies hear that Jerry runs away from home, Blue decides to go along with their plan in reverse psychology (often winking at the Pound Puppies that their plan is a success when Jerry's not looking). At the end of Kid in the Doghouse, Jerry is reunited with his parents and Blue finally has a home. Voiced by Nancy Linari.

Sir Digalot – Cooler's ancestor in Pound Puppies and the Legend of Big Paw. He was King Arthur's pet dog. While Arthur pulls Excalibur from the Stone, Digalot pulls the Bone from the Stone, enabling the ability of humans to communicate with animals with Puppy Power. Voiced by Brennan Howard.

Sherlock Bones (Bloodhound) – An oddball detective hired by the Pound Puppies and Holly to search for the Pound Puppies' stolen items in In Pups We Trust. When he finds the belongings in Howler's doghouse, he and the other Pound Puppies think he is a thief. However, it is actually a family of raccoons who steal the items, meaning that Howler is not a crook. He is later adopted by the building inspector after the inspector gives an award for Holly's clean pound. Voiced by Pat Fraley.

Spudge – A homeless dog whom Howler befriends in In Pups We Trust. While looking for food, he and Howler encounter the villainous Captain Slaughter. Fortunately, Spudge and Howler are rescued by the Pound Puppies. Voiced by Brian Cummings.

The Crushers – A group of tough dogs whom Bright Eyes meets in The Bright Eyes Mob. The group consists of Toots (the leader), Princefeld, a muscle-bound dog wearing a biker helmet and a white T-shirt with a picture of his mother on it, a short dog who wears a derby and a red T-shirt, and another small dog who wears a purple jacket. They trick Bright Eyes into stealing Mr. Bruno's weenies and some squeaky toys. However, they give up their life of crime when they are adopted by Mrs. Vanderspiff. The muscle-bound dog is voiced by Brian Cummings (uncredited).

Arnold and Archie – Twin puppies who Violet and the others met in the Pound Puppies Coloring Book exclusive story "A Haunted House Adventure". Their mother has been missing for 2 days and the twins get lost while in the Haunted House. After being rescued by the Pound Puppies, Arnold and Archie are reunited with their mother at the pound, who explains that she gets stuck in a drainpipe and is rescued by Nabbit.

Muffy – A girl dog whom Howler bids goodbye before she is adopted in The Captains and the Cats. Muffy usually ends her sentences with "Really, I am." She is inspired by Katharine Hepburn. Voiced by Ruth Buzzi.

Scratchy (Welsh Terrier) – A puppy whom Nose Marie asks Jerry to give a flea bath in Kid in the Doghouse. After spreading the fleas to everyone except Jerry, Scratchy and the others take flea baths. Later on, Jerry learns that he should be responsible for doing chores and helps the Pound Puppies and Holly clean up the Pound Puppy HQ and give Scratchy a bath. Scratchy is later adopted.

Burlap – A puppy who is put in Cage 1 in Cooler, Come Back. He is then rescued by Terry, a boy whom Cooler tells to adopt instead. Voiced by Nancy Cartwright.

Humans

Holly – A kind girl with the gift of Puppy power. She owns the puppy pound in season 1. She often helps Cooler and the gang foil Katrina. Katrina, whom Holly addresses to her as "Auntie Katrina", uses her as a slave for housework (in some ways similar to Cinderella). Like the Pound Puppies, Holly also knows when her evil guardian goes too far. In "Fairy Dogmother" she has a crush on Mervin. In season 2, her hair style and clothes change, and is a relatively minor character. It is unknown whether or not Holly's parents are alive. Their absence in the show is the likely reason why she is in Katrina's custody. Voiced by Ami Foster.

Millicent Trueblood – Katrina's wealthy and kind great-aunt and the founder of the Puppy Pound. According to Cooler, Millicent was 101 when she died from an incurable sickness (which meant that she was born in 1885). She appears in the second episode of the first season via flashback when Cooler tells a pup about the Puppy Pound's foundation. Because she comes from a very small family, Katrina was her only next of kin. Katrina believed she would inherit all her possessions (the Puppy Pound included) since her great-aunt has left no known will. However, after appearing to Cooler in a dream shortly after her death, Holly and the dogs find Millicent's will, where she leaves her home to Katrina and the Puppy Pound to Holly. Millicent Trueblood is never mentioned in any other episode of the whole series. Voiced by June Lockhart.

Katrina Stoneheart – An evil woman who gets most of Millicent Trueblood's fortune and the main villainess of the TV Series. It is obvious that she is based on Cruella de Vil. She often makes Holly work for her and do the chores she and Brattina should have done. She displays an immeasurable distaste for the Pound Puppies, and all things cute in general. Her main goal in Season 1 is to shut down the puppy pound (Ironically in Season 2, for some unknown reason, she owns a puppy pound of her own). In season 2, her main goal shifted to capturing Cooler and the Pound Puppies and locking them up or even killing them. Also in season two, her catchphrase is "Mutts Drive Me Nuts!" In Season 1, Katrina is shown to be clever, manipulative and sneaky, but in Season 2, she seems to be far less competent. In Good Night, Sweet Pups, she is allergic to penguins. Voiced by Pat Carroll.

Brattina – Katrina's equally evil daughter. She often gloats with Catgut when they're winning, but is equally quick to whine and cry when they ultimately lose. Her catchphrase is eww Icky-Poo puppies! Like Katrina, she hates dogs. When Katrina yells at her for one reason or another, she often replies with something like "Scream in my ears, why don'tcha!" She also constantly refers to Katrina as "Mommy Dearest". She also has a crush on Mervin, but then she falls in love with Captain Slaughter. In Happy Howlidays, what Brattina wants for Christmas is a Suzy-Spitup doll. She desires for the same toy in Kid in the Doghouse. The whereabouts of Brattina's father are unknown. In season 2, she starts wearing a jacket. Brattina is inspired by Anastasia and Drizella, Cinderella's evil stepsisters in Disney's Cinderella. Voiced by Adrienne Alexander.

Captain Slaughter – A sea captain that Katrina often hires to get rid of the Pound Puppies. He has a claw-like metallic right hand and his face is never shown. Slaughter was assumed to have lost his original hand years ago to a train accident while he was chasing Cooler. Slaughter has harbored an intense hatred for Cooler ever since. He is the direct descendant of Slaughtar, a cruel chieftain who leads a tribe of barbarians to chase puppies away. He appears in four Season 1 episodes: In Pups We Trust, Wagga Wagga, the Star Pup and The Captain and the Cats. He is removed from the series in Season 2. Voiced by Peter Cullen in a deeper voice.

Mervin – A young blond boy who Holly and Brattina have a crush on. He tries to ask Holly out to a school dance, but he is to afraid to ask, which leads him to go with Brattina instead. He falls in love with Brattina after Zazu's spell goes wrong. The spell is later broken and he dances with Holly. He appears in Fairy Dogmother. Voiced by Danny Cooksey.

Carolyn – A blond girl who meets Cooler and No-name (King) at the dog pound. She later adopts No-Name and named him King after Cooler is saved from the red leash. Carolyn appears in Cooler Come Home. Voiced by Lauren Taylor.

Henry – An Asian-American boy who adopts Toby. He appears in Good Night, Sweet Pups. Henry is voiced by Mitsuru Yamahata.

Colin – A brown-haired boy who has an invisible friend, Sam the Stegosaurus. He later adopts Buddy. He appears in The Invisible Friend. Voiced by Dana Hill.

Jonathon – A boy whose dog, Casey, gets lost after he and his family are on a camping trip. He is later reunited with Casey. He appears in Casey, Come Home. He is voiced by Joshua Horowitz and his parents are voiced by Lise Hilboldt and Michael Lembeck.

Mayor Fist – A mayor who is the judge at the Annual Pet Talent Show. He appears in Bright Lights, Bright Eyes. His original appearance is in The Pound Puppies TV special. Note in the special, he has a son named Arnold Fist. Voiced by Sorrell Booke in the TV special and by Mel Blanc impersonating the Looney Tunes character, Yosemite Sam, in Bright Lights, Bright Eyes.

Mr. Nabbit – A dog catcher. He appears in Snowbound Pound trying to repair the furnace but his attempts keep failing. In the TV special, he has a much larger role as a dog catcher who also behaves like a dog (having fleas and all). Note also in the TV special, he has two doberman pinchers named Itchy and Snitchy. His full name is Dabney Nabbit. Voiced by Henry Gibson in the TV special and by Frank Welker in the episode Snowbound Pound.

Tammy and Jeff – Two teenagers who run the adoption bazaar in Pound Puppies and the Legend of Big Paw, replacing Holly's role as owner of the Puppy Pound in Season 1. It is unclear whether Tammy and Jeff are siblings or girlfriend and boyfriend respectively. They are voiced by Janice Kawaye and Joey Dedio respectively.

Marvin McNasty – The main villain of Pound Puppies and the Legend of Big Paw. He is the descendant of Sir McNasty, an evil knight who tries to take over Arthur's kingdom, but is foiled when Arthur pulls Excalibur from the Stone. Marvin has two stupid henchmen named Lumpy and Bones, who usually goof up McNasty's schemes. Marvin is allergic to cats. He steals half of the bone of scone and invents the Mean Machine to turn puppies into vicious guard dogs. Ironically, at the end of the movie, after the bone of scone is back together, he and his henchmen are reformed by his own machine and helps Tammy and Jeff at the adoption bazaar. Marvin and Sir McNasty are voiced by George Rose, while Lumpy and Bones are voiced by Wayne Scherzer and Frank Welker respectively.

Arthur – A boy who becomes king after pulling Excalibur out of the stone, foiling Sir McNasty's schemes. Arthur has a dog named Digalot, who is Cooler's ancestor. He appears in Pound Puppies and the Legend of Big Paw and is voiced by James Swodec.

Flack and Tubbs – Two dognappers who are wanted in seven states for grand theft dognapping. They dognapped Violet as a ransom to the Vanderfellers. Thankfully, Violet is able to escape from them. Flack is a long-nosed skinny man with a goatee while Tubbs is a large fat man whose stupidity goofs up their plot to kidnap Violet. They are last seen arrested by the police at the end of the Pound Puppies TV special. They are voiced by Charlie Adler and Avery Schreiber respectively.

Bigelow – A 15-year experienced pound supervisor in the Pound Puppies TV Special. He is appointed to be a garbage man by Mayor Fist because the Mayor's son, Arnold, is tired of garbage. After an incident, Mayor Fist fires Bigelow. At the end of the TV Special, he is mistaken for capturing Flack and Tubbs and gets his original job back at the pound supervisor. His pet cat, Catgut, will later appear in the TV series as Katrina Stoneheart's pet. Voiced by Jonathan Winters.

Arnold Fist – Snobby and haughty son of the Mayor who once works as a garbageman. He is next in becoming pound supervisor after Bigelow gets fired. Later, his dream is dashed to bits when Bigalow is hired once again after Flack and Tubbs are arrested. Arnold appears in the Pound Puppies TV special. Voiced by Ed Begley, Jr.

Mother Superior – A kind-hearted nun who runs the St. Francis Children's Home. Two of the children who lived at the orphanage are a brown haired boy named Petey and a blond girl named Becky. Petey and Becky later adopt puppies. Mother Superior appears in the Pound Puppies TV Special. She is voiced by June Foray.

Dr. Weston – A brown-haired veterinarian of the City Pound who is referred in the Pound Puppies TV Special's title sequence as "The Doc". Secretly, she is a good friend of the Pound Puppies. In one case, she helps Cooler escape solitary confinement when Cooler played his sick act and Dr. Weston diagnose his case as "Cathasiga Nula Maniana", fooling Bigalow and Nabbit. After Nabbit and Bigalow leave, Dr. Weston awards Cooler with a cheese-flavored dog bone. An Asian-American Dr. Weston appears in the season 1 episode Snowbound Pound. She is later remade as an African American veterinarian named Dr. Simon, who only appears in the Season 2 episodes Whopper gets the Point and Bright Lights, Bright Eyes. Voiced by Victoria Carroll in the TV special, Haunani Minn in Snowbound Pound, and by Bever-Leigh Banfield in Whopper Gets the Point and Bright Lights, Bright Eyes.

Sam Quintin – A jewelry thief hired by Katrina in her plot to close Holly's puppy pound. He fools Holly and the Pound Puppies into thinking that he is a movie director and tricks Bright eyes into stealing the jewels. He is also known as "Quick Fingers" Quintin. After Holly and the Pound Puppies learn about Sam's true intentions, he is arrested by the police. He appears in Bright Eyes, Come Home. Voiced by Barry Dennen.

Melissa – A blonde-haired girl who lives at the Haven House Children's Home. She wishes for a puppy of her own. At the end of Garbage Night: The Musical, She adopts Scrounger. Voiced by Russi Taylor.

Shannon – A curly-haired girl who wants to adopt Bessie. However, Katrina stops her and her parents before they decide to adopt Bessie by telling them that the dogs aren't for sale. At the end of King Whopper, Cooler and Nose Marie deliver Bessie to Shannon. Shannon is voiced by Kathleen Helppie-Shipley and her parents are voiced by Lauri Fraser and Frank Welker.

Jerry – A blond haired boy who appears in Kid in a Doghouse. His hobbies are reading comic books and skateboarding. When he requests to the Pound Puppies that he should be "adopted" with his new dog Blue, the Pound Puppies find it unorthodox, but agree anyway. When they learn that Jerry is too lazy to do chores and he runs away from home, the Pound Puppies use reverse psychology in order to get Jerry to do chores. Afterwards, Jerry promises to do his chores (including taking care of Blue) and is reunited with his parents. Jerry is voiced by Edan Gross, his mother is voiced by Leslie Speights, and his father is voiced by Frank Welker.

Lisa – An African American girl whose family is moving to another town. When Nose Marie runs away from the Pound, Lisa adopts her. Then, just before the plane takes off, the Pound Puppies stop Nose Marie and tell her that they need her very much. Lisa instead adopts Freddie and moves away. Lisa appears in Nose Marie Day. Voiced by Deonca Brown.

Chief Williams – An African-American police chief who is referred in the Pound Puppies title sequence as "the Chief". He has a wife and a bespectacled daughter named Sarah, who loves puppies. At first, Chief Williams does not want Sarah to have a puppy because he thinks they eat too much. However, when a life-time supply of dog food is shipped along with a puppy delivered to Sarah, Chief Williams changed his mind. Chief Williams often wondered about Mayor Fist's strange behavior when he is called in the middle of the night about a high-speed chase involving Bigelow. He is last seen arresting Flack and Tubbs for grand theft dog-napping in seven states at the end of the Pound Puppies TV special. His full name is Kelly Williams. He appears again in Happy Howlidays. Chief Williams is voiced by Garrett Morris and his pet dog, a German Shepherd, is voiced by Frank Welker.

Dr. Black – Katrina's doctor who sends her on a vacation after she has a meltdown caused by the puppies. He appears in Secret Agent Pup. Voiced by Arthur Burghardt.

Slaughtar – An evil caveman who rules a tribe of barbarians aiming to get rid of puppies, who once rules the Earth. He is Captain Slaughter's ancestor. The members of his villainous tribe include the ancestors of Katrina Stoneheart, Brattina, and Catgut. He appears in The Star Pup and is voiced by Peter Cullen.

Greg – A short, brown-haired boy who is depressed because his friend moves away. He adopts Pal so he will not be lonely anymore. He appears in Tail of the Pup. Voiced by Katie Leigh.

Edgar and Chauncey – Two police officers who chase Katrina's car. At the end of The Rescue Pups, thinking that the driver is Katrina Stoneheart, they are last seen giving Katrina speeding tickets. They are voiced by Sorrell Booke (uncredited) and Ernie Hudson respectively.

Jody – A blond haired girl whose mother refuses to let her adopt Arf in The Rescue Pups. Jody's mother disapproves the adoption because having a puppy will be too much noise. So, Jody runs away. However, on her way to the Puppy Pound, Jody falls into a hole and calls for help. Thanks to the Pound Puppies, Arf, The Fire Department, and the Police Department, Jody is rescued and her mother finally agrees to let Jody adopt Arf, but only if she doesn't run away again. Jody is voiced by Kristina Chan and her mother is voiced by Susan Rhee.

Charlie – A young, red-haired boy who adopts Tiny in Happy Howlidays. Despite the fact that Tiny has a limp, Charlie still loves him anyway. He is voiced by Patric Zimmerman and his mother is voiced by Ruth Buzzi.

The Belveshires – A wealthy family who appear in From Wags to Riches. According to Katrina, the Belveshires are the third richest couple in the country. Lord Belveshire usually speaks gibberish, so his wife, Lady Belveshire, is like his interpreter, translating what her husband is trying to say. They have a bespectacled son named Hubert, who usually reads his book. They invite Holly and the Pound Puppies (along with Buster) to their house so they can help them keep the pound open. When the library is destroyed by Catgut and his friends, they accuse the Pound Puppies of wrecking it. Later, they find out that it is Catgut and his friends who did it (caught on camera) and tell Katrina that her plans of making a condominium on top of Holly's property has been denied. Hubert later adopts Buster. Lord Belveshire is voiced by Clive Revill, while Lady Belveshire is voiced by Marilyn Lightstone, and their son, Hubert, is voiced by Chad Allen.

Santa Claus – He appears in Whopper's imagination trying to find the Pound Puppies in Happy Howlidays. Whopper fears that if Santa misses Holly's Puppy Pound, he'll give all his presents to Brattina instead. Voiced by Clive Revill.

Mr. Hubert – A mailman who delivers Holly's overdue bill to Katrina in Happy Howlidays. Voiced by Ronnie Schell.

The Simons – A family whose dog, Shauna, is missing during a severe snowstorm in Snowbound Pound. In a TV interview following Shauna's disappearance, they make a plea to the viewers that if Shauna is found, the Simons will reward the good Samaritan $5,000. Later, they are reunited with Shauna and her nine children after the storm ends and rewards Holly and the Pound Puppies $5,000. Note that they are not related with Dr. Simon from Season 2. Mr. and Mrs. Simon are voiced by Steve Bulen and B.J. Ward respectively.

The Vanderfellers – A wealthy family from Hamstead whose dog, Violet, is dognapped by Flack and Tubbs as a ransom. Later in the movie, just as Violet is about to be reunited with her owners, Flack and Tubbs try to kidnap her again. This time, however, the Pound Puppies and Bigelow stop the dognappers and save Violet. Mr. Phil Vandefeller and Mrs. Gloria Vanderfeller have a son and a daughter named Nathan, a brown-haired boy with a green tie and his little sister, Chelsea, a blond, curly-haired girl with a pink bow. Nathan and Chelsea's names are never mentioned in the TV special. They appear in the TV special. Nathan and Chelsea are voiced by Patric Zimmerman (uncredited) and Laura Duff respectively.

Nahook – An Inuit boy who adopts Thunderhawk to enter the sled-race. He is jealous of his rival, Oran, who constantly makes fun of Nahook. However, in the end, Nahook and Oran both lose the race to Laura Swanson. Oran and Nahook make up and Nahook still loves Thunderhawk because they know that being friends is more important than winning. He appears in Snow Puppies. Voiced by Brian Mitchell.

Oran – Another eskimo boy who is Nahook's rival. He usually taunts Nahook, knowing that he will win the sled race. In the end, both Oran and Nahook lose the race to Laura Swanson and make up. He appears in Snow Puppies. Voiced by David Mendenhall.

Davie – A blond-haired boy who is bored after the playground closes. Beezer meets him and persuade to use his imagination, therefore, he will not be bored anymore. Afterwards, Davie adopts Beezer. He appears in The Wonderful World of Whopper. Voiced by Justin Gocke.

Mrs. Vanderspiff – A wealthy socialite who attends Katrina Stoneheart's party in The Bright eyes Mob to see how capable Katrina is with dogs. Just when she is about to give Katrina $1 Million, Mrs. Vanderspiff learns that Katrina is a fraud. Mrs. Vanderspiff instead adopts Toots and her gang. Voiced by Kath Soucie.

Mrs. Gungenfeller – A famous socialite who is tricked by Katrina to be a judge for the Annual Pet Talent Show. She has a pet Pekingese of her own. She appears in Bright Lights, Bright Eyes.

Mr. Bruno – The owner of Bruno's Meat Market whose weenies are stolen by Bright Eyes in The Bright Eyes Mob. In a TV interview, he incorrectly describes Bright Eyes as a "vicious criminal-type canine". Voiced by Brian Cummings (uncredited).

Matthew – A red-haired boy with freckles who has a pet mouse named Blabber. He teaches Blabber how to play horns to the tune of "Three Blind Mice". They participate at the Annual Pet Talent Show in Bright Lights, Bright Eyes.

Pierre – A general store manager who sells Katrina Stoneheart traps to capture the Pound Puppies in Snow Puppies. Pierre even sells a snowmobile to Katrina. Voiced by René Auberjonois.

Laura Swanson – An inuit girl who wins the sled race with her dog in Snow Puppies.

Terry – A brown-haired boy who comes to the dog pound Cooler is staying in Cooler, Come Back. He is unsure on which dog he should adopt until Cooler tells him to adopt Burlap. Terry then adopted Burlap, saving him from the red leash. Voiced by Phillip Glasser.

Cats

Catgut (Siamese) – Katrina Stonehart's evil cat who constantly tries to cause trouble for the Pound Puppies. Catgut is originally Bigalow's pet cat in the Pound Puppies TV Special. In From Wags to Riches, he has a gang who helps him wreck the Belveshire’s library. Catgut is inspired by Lucifer, Madame Tremaine's evil pet cat from Disney's Cinderella. Vocal effects provided by Frank Welker in the TV series and in the TV Special.

Tuffy (Turkish Angora) – A cat who is mistaken for a dog when he is very dirty. Before he is clean, he is mistaken for a dog by Whopper and becomes friends with him. However, after he is clean, Whopper is no longer his friend. After Tuffy saves Whopper and Bright Eyes from Catgut, Tuffy and Whopper are once again friends. He is the first cat to be adopted from the puppy pound. Note that he hates taking baths. He appears in Tuffy Gets Fluffy. Voiced by Frank Welker.

Hairball (Nebelung) – A cat who, hence his name, hacks a hairball. He has a girlfriend named Charlamange. He appears in Pound Puppies and the Legend of Big Paw. Voiced by Frank Welker.

Charlamange (Colorpoint Shorthair) – Hairball's girlfriend. She and Hairball are also known as a two cat group called Pound Purries. Charlamange is sometimes tomboyish. She appears in Pound Puppies and the Legend of Big Paw. Voiced by Cathy Cavadini.

Mouseketeers – A trio of cats whom the Pound Puppies meet in The Captain and the Cats. The reason why they want Captain Slaughter to catch them is because they suspect he kidnaps their mentor, Dumas (voiced by Clive Revill). However, it appears that Dumas has been in hiding all along. They help the Pound Puppies rescue Whopper and the other pets afterwards. Mouseketeer #1 has grey fur and wears a blue hat (voiced by Barry Dennen). Mouseketeer #2 has yellow fur and resembles Oliver Hardy (voiced by Oliver Hardy impersonator Chuck McCann). Mouseketeer #3 is a girl cat with orange fur and wears a green bonnet (voiced by Adrienne Alexander). Their unusual battle cry is "One for All! All for One! And a partridge in a pear tree!" This trio of cats is a play on The Three Musketeers and Dumas is the play of Alexander Dumas, the author. Not to be confused with the term Mouseketeer from The Mickey Mouse Club.

Alley Cats – A duo of cats who try to beat up Bright Eyes, but are stopped by Cooler in Bright Eyes, Come Home. Voiced by Frank Welker.

Other

Silver Paw – A leader of the wolves who, hence his namesake, has a front silver-like paw. Silver Paw and his tribe helps the Pound Puppies cross Danger Mountain to help Casey find his owners. Cooler saves him just before Danger Mountain collapse and Silver Paw, in return, keeps Katrina busy. He appears in Casey, Come Home. Voiced by Erv Immeman.

Shadow Monster – A shadowy creature who is actually Whopper's fear of the dark in Whopper's nightmares in Good Night, Sweet Pups. Voiced by Charlie Adler (uncredited).

Cheep Cheep – A baby bird who is injured after an attempt to fly. He is rescued from Catgut by Bright Eyes and is able to recover at the Pound Puppies HQ. However, Cheep Cheep begins behaving like a dog. He is later reunited with his parents after he is able to fly. He appears in The Bird Dog and is voiced by Frank Welker.

Cooler Wolf – Cooler's ancestor in Casey, Come Home. Voiced by Dan Gilvezan.

Red Alert Pup – A talking alarm system at the Pound Puppy HQ who usually reports emergencies and news in Season 2 of the TV Series. His favorite story is Peter Pup. Voiced by Don Messick (uncredited).

Robotic Rover – A battery-operated robotic dog built by Katrina Stoneheart in The Bright Eyes Mob. He is invented by Katrina to fool Mrs. Vanderspiff into thinking that Katrina loves dogs. However, one of his parts is taken by Howler and causes Robotic Rover to endlessly kiss Katrina. The Pound Puppies are able to stop Robotic Rover by bumping into Brattina, causing her to drop the remote control in the punch bowl. This puts a stop to Katrina's chance of getting $1 Million from Mrs. Vanderspiff. Vocal effects provided by Frank Welker.

Squiggly – A young caterpillar whom Whopper makes friends with in Dog and Caterpillar. When Squiggly saves Whopper from Catgut, Whopper and Squiggly are good friends. Later, Squiggly turns into a butterfly and says goodbye to Whopper. Voiced by Frank Welker.

Rocky – The head of a family of racoons who steal the Pound Puppies' items in In Pups We Trust. The reason why they stole the items is because stealing is part of their natural lives and they can’t help it. Later, Rocky and his family, to make it up with the Pound Puppies, help Holly and the others rebuild the pound when it is wrecked by Catgut. Voiced by Steve Bulen.

Blabber – A mouse who participated at the Annual Pet Talent Show in Bright Lights, Bright Eyes. His owner is Matthew. While playing his horns to the tune of "Three Blind Mice", he is distracted by Brattina wearing a cheese costume. Just as he is about to be eaten by Catgut, Cooler and Nose Marie come to the rescue by wearing a tuna can costume and trapping Catgut in a trash can. Thus, Blabber is able to finish his act. Vocal effects provided by Frank Welker.

See also
Pound Puppies
Pound Puppies (film)

References

Hanna-Barbera characters
Lists of characters in American television animation
teagan hill is the best